Edit Bauer (born 30 August 1946 in (Somorja Šamorín)
is a Slovak politician of Hungarian ethnicity and
Member of the European Parliament (MEP).

No imformation found. But there's something i can say.

Education 
 1968: University of Economics, Bratislava
 1980: Slovak Academy of Sciences, PhD

See also
 2004 European Parliament election in Slovakia

References

External links 
 
 

1946 births
Living people
People from Šamorín
Hungarians in Slovakia
University of Economics in Bratislava alumni
Party of the Hungarian Community MEPs
MEPs for Slovakia 2004–2009
MEPs for Slovakia 2009–2014
Women MEPs for Slovakia
Members of the National Council (Slovakia) 1992-1994
Members of the National Council (Slovakia) 1994-1998
Members of the National Council (Slovakia) 2002-2006
Female members of the National Council (Slovakia)